San Felipe is a village in Orange Walk District, Belize. According to the 2010 census, San Felipe has a population of 1,499 people in 332 households. The village is home to the Premier League of Belize football team San Felipe Barcelona who play at San Felipe Football Field.

References

External links
 San Felipe

Populated places in Orange Walk District
Orange Walk South